The Hannover Messe (HM; "Hanover Fair") is one of the world's largest trade fairs, dedicated to the topic of industry development. It is organized by Deutsche Messe AG and held on the Hanover Fairground in Hanover, Germany. Typically, there are about 6,500 exhibitors and 250,000 visitors.

The Hannover Messe started in 1947 in an undamaged factory building in Laatzen, south of Hanover, by an arrangement of the British military government in order to boost the economic advancement of post-war Germany. The first fair was colloquially known as Fischbrötchenmesse (Fischbrötchen fair) due to the exemptions in food rationing for the fair at this time. It proved hugely successful and was thence repeated on a yearly basis, contributing largely to the success of the Hanover fairground in replacing the then-East German city of Leipzig as the new major fair city for West Germany.

The product portfolio includes building automation and technology, coating materials, air compressors, gas compressors, environmental technology, factory equipment, compressed air technology, micro-actuator systems, motors, scheduling software, refrigeration technology, robotics and additive manufacturing systems.

In the 1980s, the growing information and telecommunication industry demanded the organizer Deutsche Messe AG to split the fair. CeBIT was a successful spin-off of the Hannover Messe. The Hanover Fair now covers all areas of industrial technology.

The most recent Hanover Fair took place in May 30 to June 2, 2022, with Portugal as the partner country.

Hermes Award
The "Hermes Award" has been presented as a technology innovation prize at the Hanover Fair since 2004. It is considered to be the most prestigious award in industrial R&D. The prize promotes the innovative ideas in the market-ready products and services for industry. The patrons of the award are the German Federal Ministry of Education and Research and the German State of Lower Saxony. Renowned German Professor Wolfgang Wahlster was one of the initiators of the award and for many years was the Chairman of the Hermes Award Jury.

Partner Countries
Hannover Messe has changed over the years, from a local trade fair into a global event. In the 2000s, a partner country model had been introduced, so that a single country is the leading one during the certain year. At the official trade fair opening event, the partner country is responsible to present an extensive artistic performance connected to the country's history and culture. Apart for this, the partner country shows the selected, top innovations at the national stand and many other companies from this specific country attend as exhibitors.
 2006 dates: 24–28 April (Partner Country: India)
 2007 dates: 16–20 April (Partner Country: Turkey)
 2008 dates: 21–25 April (Partner Country: Japan)
 2009 dates: 20–24 April (Partner Country: Korea)
 2010 dates: 19–23 April (Partner Country: Italy)
 2011 dates: 4–8 April (Partner Country: France)
 2012 dates: 23–27 April (Partner Country: China)
 2013 dates: 8–12 April (Partner Country: Russia)
 2014 dates: 7–11 April (Partner Country: Netherlands)
 2015 dates: 13–17 April (Partner Country: India)
 2016 dates: 25–29 April (Partner Country: United States)
 2017 dates: 24–28 April (Partner Country: Poland)
 2018 dates: 23–27 April (Partner Country: Mexico)
 2019 dates: 1–5 April (Partner Country: Sweden)
 2020 dates: 13–17 July (postponed from 20–24 April) digital edition due to COVID-19
 2021 dates: 12–16 April (Partner Country: Indonesia) digital edition due to COVID-19
 2022 dates: 30 May – 2 June (Partner Country: Portugal)
 2023 dates: 17 - 21 April (Partner Country: Indonesia)

References

External links 

Trade fairs in Germany
Recurring events established in 1947
Tourist attractions in Hanover
Economy of Lower Saxony